Change of Heart was a dating game show that was hosted by Chris Jagger (1998–2001; 2002–03) then Lynne Koplitz (2001–02) and syndicated by Warner Bros. Television Distribution (via its Telepictures unit). During the 1998-2001 season, Ryan Seacrest would also serve as a fill-in host during some episodes with Phil Kollin doing the same during the 2001–02 season. Koplitz was not asked back for the 2002–03 season due to an undisclosed financial issue.

The series was featured in a 1999 episode of The Jamie Foxx Show, while rapper The Game also made an appearance that same year.

The show was originally taped in Los Angeles for its first three seasons, and then moved to New York City in 2001, where it would remain for the last two. During season 1, Change of Heart was once paired in most markets with a revival of Love Connection hosted by Pat Bullard in 1998, which was cancelled after one season. From 2000 to 2003, the series was also paired in some markets with another game show, Street Smarts hosted by Frank Nicotero.

The premise of the show involved dating couples who are matched up with other singles and then sent out on respective dates. During the taping, they discuss their relationship, then their new dating experience. At the end of show the couples have to decide if they want to "Stay Together", or if they've had a "Change Of Heart".

References

External links
 Official site (Jagger era) via Internet Archive
 Official site (Koplitz era) via Internet Archive 
 

Television series by Warner Bros. Television Studios
First-run syndicated television programs in the United States
1990s American game shows
2000s American game shows
1990s American reality television series
2000s American reality television series
American dating and relationship reality television series
1998 American television series debuts
2003 American television series endings
Television shows set in Los Angeles
Television shows set in New York City
Television series by Telepictures